FRSA most often refers to Fellow of the Royal Society of Arts, an honorary membership in a British society.

FRSA may also refer to:

Fire and Rescue Services Act 2004, an act of parliament of the United Kingdom
Fire and Rescue Services Association, a British trade union
Fire Research and Safety Act of 1968, an act of the United States Congress
Frankenia salina, a plant with Natural Resources Conservation Service identifier FRSA
FARSA (gene), the gene for a human RNA synthetase enzyme also abbreviated as FRSA